"Haunting" / "Workout" is a double A-side by the British record producer Andy C, released on 3 November 2013 through his renowned drum and bass label RAM Records. "Workout" entered the UK Singles Chart at number 188 and the UK Dance Chart at number 26 on 16 November 2013. The songs serve as singles from Andy C's mix album Nightlife 6.

Track listing

Chart performance

For "Workout"
Chart positions listed for "Workout".

Release history

References

2013 songs
2013 singles
Drum and bass songs
RAM Records singles